Carlos Eduardo (born December 9, 1981) is a Brazilian mixed martial artist currently competing in the Heavyweight division. A professional competitor since 2003, he has competed for Bellator, M-1 Global, and Absolute Championship Akhmat.

Mixed martial arts career

Early career
Eduardo started his professional career in 2003. Initially, he fought twice in the Brazilian circuit, becoming inactive in 2005 and 2006. In 2007 he came back, alternating fights in American promotions as Extreme Challenge and Battle Cage Xtreme, and Brazilian promotions as Amazon Fight and Nocaute Fight Combat.

He faced opponents like the then prospect and future UFC champion Jon Jones, and the once Brazilian jiu-jitsu world champion Erick Wanderley.

Shooto Brazil
Eduardo won the Shooto light heavyweight title on April 26, 2012 at Shooto Brazil 29 against Marcos Rogério de Lima. He won the fight via knockout early in the second round.

He defended his title once, on July 12, 2013 at Shooto Brazil 41 against Marcus Vinícius Lopes. He defeated Lopes via unanimous decision after three rounds.

Bellator MMA
Eduardo made his promotional debut on October 11, 2013 at Bellator 103 against Wayman Carter. He won via submission due to a rear-naked choke in the very first round.

Eduardo faced UFC veteran Rodney Wallace on April 11, 2014 at Bellator 116. Eduardo lost via unanimous decision (30–27, 30–27, and 29–28).

Eduardo faced Egidijus Valavičius in the quarterfinal match of Bellator 2014 summer series light heavyweight tournament on June 6, 2014 at Bellator 121. Valavičius defeated Eduardo via split decision.

On June 25, 2014, Eduardo was released from the promotion, along with 18 other fighters.

Difficulties and return to MMA
In 2014 , after losing two straight in Bellator, Eduardo was disconnected from the organization and eventually lost his sponsorships.

With this Cachorrão was forced to take a break in his MMA career and returned to give jiu-jitsu classes and also to compete in the gentle art.

After little more than a year, Eduardo back to MMA in the main event of an 1 Round Combat in his hometown and wins by submission in the second round athlete Kleber Silva, Luiz Carlos Dorea pupil.

Return to Shooto Brazil
Eduardo returned to Shooto on April 2, 2016 at Shooto Brazil 62 to face Cássio Barbosa "Jacaré" for the vacant title of the light heavyweight division. However "Jacaré" left the event to fight in a Russian event and was replaced hastily by Willyanedson Paiva. He won by submission (armlock) in the very first round to again become the champion of Shooto Brazil.

Absolute Championship Berkut 
He won the bout via split decision.

He lost the but via unanimous decision.

He won the bout via TKO (punches) in the second round.

He won the bout via first round rear-naked submission.

He lost the bout after being unable to continue due to a leg injury in the third round.

He lost the bout via unanimous decision.

Eduardo faced Goran Reljić on April 23, 2021 at ACA 122. He lost the bout via split decision.

Eduardo faced Oleg Olenyechev on June 29, 2021 at ACA 125. He lost the bout via split decision.

Eduardo faced Adlan Ibragimov at ACA 135 on January 28, 2022. Eduardo lost the bout after it was stopped after the first round due to a cut.

Post ACA 
Eduardo faced Benjamin Šehić on July 23, 2022 at Serbian Battle Championship 43. He won the bout via TKO stoppage at the end of the third round.

Championships and accomplishments

Mixed martial arts
 Shooto Brazil
 Shooto Brazil Light Heavyweight Championship (Two times)
 One successful title defense

Mixed martial arts record

|-
| Win
| align=center|20–10
| Benjamin Šehić
| TKO (punches)
|Serbian Battle Championship 43
|
|align=center|2
|align=center|4:24
|Secanj, Serbia
|
|-
| Loss
| align=center|19–10
| Adlan Ibragimov
| TKO (doctor stoppage)
|ACA 135: Gasanov vs. Dzhanaev
|
|align=center|1
|align=center|5:00
|Grozny, Russia
|
|-
| Loss
| align=center|19–9
| Oleg Olenyechev
| Decision (split)
|ACA 125: Dudaev vs. de Lima
|
|align=center|3
|align=center|5:00
|Sochi, Russia
|
|-
| Loss
| align=center|19–8
| Goran Reljić
| Decision (split)
|ACA 122: Johnson vs. Poberezhets
|
|align=center|3
|align=center|5:00
|Minsk, Belarus
|
|-
|Loss
|align=center|19–7
|Cory Hendricks 
|Decision (unanimous)
|ACA 114: Omielańczuk vs. Johnson
|
|align=center|3
|align=center|5:00
|Łódź, Poland
|Catchweight (210 lbs) bout.
|-
|Loss
|align=center|19–6
|Muslim Magomedov 
|TKO (leg injury)
|ACA 105: Shakhbulatov vs. Oliveira
|
|align=center|3
|align=center|0:48
|Almaty, Kazakhstan
|
|-
|Win
|align=center|19–5
|Isa Umarov
|Submission (rear-naked choke)
|ACA 102: Tumenov vs. Ushukov
|
|align=center|1
|align=center|2:35
|Almaty, Kazakhstan
|  
|-
|Win
|align=center|18–5
|Sami Antar
|TKO (punches)
|ACA 96: Goncharov vs. Johnson
|
|align=center|2
|align=center|1:20
|Łódź, Poland
|  
|-
|Loss
|align=center|17–5
|Daniel Sarafian
|Decision (unanimous)
|ACB 82: Silva vs. Kolobegov
|
|align=center|3
|align=center|5:00
|São Paulo, Brazil
|
|-
| Win
| align=center | 17–4
| Fábio Silva 
| Decision (split)
| |ACB 73: Silva vs. Makoev 
| 
| align=center | 3
| align=center | 5:00
| Rio de Janeiro, Brazil
|
|-
| Win
| align=center | 16–4
| Rene Hoppe
| TKO (corner stoppage)
| M-1 Challenge 80: Kharitonov vs. Sokoudjou
| 
| align=center | 1
| align=center | 1:06
| Harbin, Heilongjiang, China
|
|-
| Win
| align=center | 15–4
| Boris Polejay
| Decision (unanimous)
| M-1 Challenge 75: Shlemenko vs. Bradley
| 
| align=center | 3
| align=center | 5:00
| Moscow, Russia
|
|-
| Win
| align=center | 14–4
| Julio Juarez Vieira
| Submission (rear-naked choke)
| 1° Round Combat 3 
| 
| align=center | 1
| align=center | 0:59
| Sao Benedito, Brazil 
| 
|-
| Win
| align=center | 13–4
| Willyanedson Paiva
| Submission (armbar)
| Shooto Brazil 62
| 
| align=center | 1
| align=center | 2:55
| Recife, Brazil 
| 
|-
| Win
| align=center | 12–4
| Kleber Silva
| Submission (americana)
| 1° Round Combat 1
| 
| align=center | 2
| align=center | 4:05
| Fortaleza, Ceará, Brazil
|
|-
| Loss
| align=center | 11–4
| Egidijus Valavičius
| Decision (split)
| Bellator 121
| 
| align=center | 3
| align=center | 5:00
| Thackerville, Oklahoma, United States
| 
|-
| Loss
| align=center | 11–3
| Rodney Wallace
| Decision (unanimous)
| Bellator 116
| 
| align=center | 3
| align=center | 5:00
| Temecula, California, United States
|
|-
| Win
| align=center | 11–2
| Wayman Carter
| Submission (rear-naked choke)
| Bellator 103
| 
| align=center | 1
| align=center | 2:06
| Wichita, Kansas, United States
|
|-
| Win
| align=center | 10–2
| Marcus Vinícius Lopes
| Decision (unanimous)
| Shooto Brazil 41
| 
| align=center | 3
| align=center | 5:00
| Brasília, Brazil
| 
|-
| Win
| align=center | 9–2
| Marcos Rogério de Lima
| KO (punches)
| Shooto Brazil 29
| 
| align=center | 2
| align=center | 0:17
| Rio de Janeiro, Brazil
| 
|-
| Win
| align=center | 8–2
| Angel Orellana
| TKO (retirement)
| Shooto Brazil 28
| 
| align=center | 2
| align=center | 5:00
| Rio de Janeiro, Brazil
|
|-
| Win
| align=center | 7–2
| Raul Jimenez
| Submission (rear-naked choke)
| Kumite MMA Combate
| 
| align=center | 1
| align=center | 2:24
| Porto Alegre, Rio Grande do Sul, Brazil
|
|-
| Win
| align=center | 6–2
| Ubiratan Marinho Lima
| Decision (unanimous)
| Amazon Fight 9
| 
| align=center | 3
| align=center | 5:00
| Belém, Pará, Brazil
|
|-
| Win
| align=center | 5–2
| Erick Wanderley
| TKO (punches)
| International Fighter Championship
| 
| align=center | 3
| align=center | 1:24
| Recife, Pernambuco, Brazil
|
|-
| Win
| align=center | 4–2
| Ryan Contaldi
| Submission (armbar)
| Battle Cage Xtreme 5
| 
| align=center | 1
| align=center | 1:24
| Atlantic City, New Jersey, United States
|
|-
| Win
| align=center | 3–2
| Daniel Animal
| Submission (armbar)
| Nocaute Fight: MMA Edition 1
| 
| align=center | 3
| align=center | 2:55
| Fortaleza, Ceará, Brazil
|
|-
| Loss
| align=center | 2–2
| Jon Jones
| KO (punch)
| Battle Cage Xtreme 4
| 
| align=center | 3
| align=center | 0:24
| Atlantic City, New Jersey, United States
|
|-
| Loss
| align=center | 2–1
| Lewis Pascavage
| DQ (illegal kick)
| Extreme Challenge 78
| 
| align=center | 1
| align=center | 0:58
| Asbury Park, New Jersey, United States
|
|-
| Win
| align=center | 2–0
| Sergio Thomsem
| Submission (armbar)
| Shooto Brazil: New Generation
| 
| align=center | 2
| align=center | 3:26
| Curitiba, Paraná, Brazil
|
|-
| Win
| align=center | 1–0
| Magno Penha
| TKO (punches)
| K-1 Brazil: New Stars
| 
| align=center | 2
| align=center | 3:12
| Curitiba, Paraná, Brazil
|

References

1981 births
Living people
Sportspeople from Fortaleza
Brazilian male mixed martial artists
Light heavyweight mixed martial artists
Mixed martial artists utilizing Brazilian jiu-jitsu
Brazilian practitioners of Brazilian jiu-jitsu
People awarded a black belt in Brazilian jiu-jitsu